Nile is a rural locality in the local government area of Northern Midlands in the Central region of Tasmania. The 2016 census determined a population of 154 for the state suburb of Nile.

History
Nile was gazetted as a locality in 1959. It was originally known as Lymington.

Geography
The South Esk River forms the western boundary.

Road infrastructure
The C416 route (Nile Road) enters from the north-west and runs through to the south-east before exiting. Route C418 (Clarendon Station Road / Clarendon Lodge Road) starts at an intersection with C416 north of the village and runs west and then north before exiting. Route C419 (Bryants Lane) starts at the same intersection and runs north-east before exiting. Route C420 (Deddington Road) starts at an intersection with C416 just south of the village and also exits to the north-east.

References

Localities of Northern Midlands Council
Towns in Tasmania